Aarne as a surname  may refer to:
Antti Aarne (1867–1925), Finnish folklorist
Els Aarne (1917–1995), Estonian composer
Johan Victor Aarne (1863–1934), Finnish metalsmith

As a given name it may refer to:
Aarne Ahi (born 1943), Estonian animator and animated film director
Aarne Arvonen (1897–2009), Finnish supercentenarian
Aarne Blick (1894–1964), Finnish lieutenant general
Aarne Castrén (1923–1997), Finnish sailor
Aarne Ermus (born 1966), Estonian Defense Force colonel
Aarne Ervi (1910–1977), Finnish architect
Aarne Haapakoski (1904–1961), Finnish pulp writer
Aarne Heikinheimo (1894–1938), Finnish major general
Aarne Hermlin (1940–2007), Estonian chess player
Aarne Honkavaara (1924–2016), Finnish ice hockey player and coach
Aarne Hytönen (1901–1972), Finnish architect
Aarne Juutilainen (1904–1976), Finnish army captain
Aarne Kainlauri (born 1915), Finnish former steeplechaser
Aarne Kallberg (1891–1945), Finnish long-distance runner
Aarne Kalliala (born 1950), Finnish actor
Aarne Kauhanen (1909–1949), Finnish officer 
Aarne Kauppinen (1889–1927), Finnish artisan, smallholder, and politician 
Aarne Kreuzinger-Janik (born 1950), German Bundeswehr lieutenant general
Aarne Lakomaa (1914–2001), Finnish aircraft designer
Aarne Lindholm (1889–1972), Finnish long-distance runner 
Aarne Lindroos (born 1960), Finnish rower 
Aarne Ilmari Niemelä (1907–1975), Finnish chess player 
Aarne Nirk (born 1987), Estonian hurdler
Aarne Nuorvala (1912–2013), Finnish official
Aarne Orjatsalo (1883–1941), Finnish actor, theater manager, writer, revolutionary and soldier
Aarne Pelkonen (1891–1949), Finnish gymnast, competed in the 1912 Summer Olympics
Aarne Penttinen (1918–1981), Finnish politician
Aarne Peussa (1900–1941), Finnish middle-distance runner
Aarne Pohjonen (1886–1938), Finnish gymnast, competed in the 1908 Summer Olympics
Aarne Pulkkinen (1915–1977), Finnish smallholder and politician
Aarne Rannamäe (1958–2016), Estonian journalist
Aarne Reini (1906–1974), Finnish wrestler and Olympic medalist in Greco-Roman wrestling
Aarne Roine (1893–1938), Finnish gymnast
Aarne Ruben (born 1971), Estonian writer
Aarne Saarinen (1913–2004), Finnish politician and trade union leader
Aarne Salovaara (1887–1945), Finnish gymnast and track and field athlete
Aarne Saluveer (born 1959), Estonian conductor and music pedagogue
Aarne Sihvo (1889–1963), Finnish general
Aarne Soro (born 1974), Estonian actor
Aarne Michaёl Tallgren (1885–1945), Finnish archaeologist
Aarne Tarkas (1923–1976), Finnish film director, screenwriter, producer and actor
Aarne Üksküla (1937–2017), Estonian actor
Aarne Valkama (1909–1969), Finnish Nordic combined skier
Aarne Veedla (born 1963), Estonian historian and politician
Aarne Vehkonen (1927–2011), Finnish weightlifter
Aarne Viisimaa (1898–1989), Estonian operatic tenor and opera director
Aarne Wuorimaa (1892–1975), Finnish diplomat

See also 
Aarne–Thompson classification system, to help folklorists identify recurring plot patterns in the narrative structures of traditional folktales
Arn (disambiguation)
Arne (name)

Masculine given names
Finnish masculine given names
Estonian masculine given names